Yalong may refer to:

Yalong River, river in China
Yalong Bay, bay in Hainan, China
Geylang, a district in Singapore, transliterated in Chinese as Yalong